A dependent adult is an adult who is not a senior citizen and who needs assistance to carry out normal activities or to protect their rights, or who is in a hospital for at least a 24-hour stay. Dependent adults have special rights and protections from abuse. After the age of 64, a person who might otherwise be considered a dependent adult is afforded other rights and protections as a senior citizen or elder. Laws regulating dependent adult abuse are very similar or identical to those governing elder abuse.

The definition is similar from state to state. California Welfare and Institutions Code Section 15610.23 defines a dependent adult as:

References

Developmental psychology